Go Baby Go may refer to:

 "Cherry Lips," also known as "Cherry Lips (Go Baby Go!)," a 2001 song by alternative rock group Garbage
 "Don't Upset the Rhythm (Go Baby Go)," a 2009 song by the British band Noisettes